Mount Wilhelm is the highest mountain in Papua New Guinea at . It is part of the Bismarck Range and the peak is the point where three provinces, Chimbu, Jiwaka and Madang, meet. The peak is also known as Enduwa Kombuglu, or Kombugl'o Dimbin, in the local Kuman.

The mountain is on the island of New Guinea, which incorporates Papua New Guinea and the Indonesian province of Papua. It is surpassed by Puncak Jaya, and several other peaks in Indonesian Papua.

Mount Wilhelm may be considered the highest mountain in Oceania (including Australia and New Zealand). A Seven Summits list may therefore sometimes include Mount Wilhelm.

History

Discovery
Mount Wilhelm received its name in 1888 when a German newspaper correspondent, Hugo Zöller, climbed the Finisterre Range, south-east of Madang, and named the Bismarck Range after the German Chancellor, Otto von Bismarck, and the four highest peaks of the range after him and his children: Ottoberg, Herbertberg, Marienberg and Wilhelmberg. Ottoberg seemed to Zöller to be the highest of the range, but it was later discovered to be only  and the distant Wilhelmberg was much taller.

It was not until August 1938 when Leigh Vial, a government patrol officer, and two Niu Ginians, his "Mangi mastas", "Namba Wan Bare Kuakawa" (Kugl'kane) and "Gend" ("Mondia Nigle"), made the first recorded ascent. It was noted by Vial that even though the mountain was close to the equator, snow existed on top of the mountain during his ascent.

Second World War bomber crash

During the Second World War in the early hours of May 22, 1944, an American F-7A (a converted B-24 Liberator) named "Under Exposed" crashed into the mountain while it was flying too low. The aircraft left from Nadzab airbase, close to Lae, and had been assigned for a reconnaissance mission to photograph Padaidori Island in Dutch New Guinea.
All of the crew were killed, and most of the wreckage landed in the highest lake although some can still be seen. The only remains at the site are from the plane, as all of the bodies have been recovered.

Climbing deaths
A number of people have died trying to climb the mountain. An Australian Army Sergeant, Christopher Donnan, died in December 1971 when he fell down a steep slope. There is a plaque at the point where he was last seen. In August 1995 an Israeli backpacker died after he sprained his ankle and stayed behind while his group continued. He subsequently wandered off the track and fell into a ravine in the pre-dawn darkness. His body was found about a week later. On July 30, 2005, 58-year-old Bob Martin, a marketing manager at Air Niugini, suffered a heart attack and died near the summit.
In 2001, a student from Muaina High School (Muaina High school Mt Wilhelm Expedition) died at Piunde-foot of Mount Wilhelm. He was later found to be an asthmatic patient. Another, local Papua New Guinean, from Tari in the Southern Highlands Province, died in 2007 a few meters south of the Christopher Donnan plaque. Local sources revealed that the deceased was unaware of the warning and was wearing only his sporting suit, T-shirt and Dunlop shoes. He was covered by debris and fallen rock fragments, forming a talus at the base of the southern tip of the Christopher Donnan section.

Ascending

Mount Wilhelm is the most accessible mountain to climb in Papua New Guinea. Climbers have a choice of two different routes to the top. The most common route starts from the village of Keglsugl at the end of the road from Kundiawa in Simbu province. A harder hike and climb starts from the village of Ambullua in Western Highlands province.

The Keglsugl route involves climbing up and through a mountain rain forest and then along an alpine grassland glacial valley to the twin lakes of Piunde and Aunde. At Piunde there are two huts, one being an old Australian National University monitoring station and the other an 'A-Frame' hut. Though not a technical climb, various sections can be treacherous in wet weather. The climb is usually started during the night; the ascent and subsequent descent can take anywhere from nine to 24 hours. Reaching the peak at dawn allows a better chance of clear weather.

The other route from Ambullua is a much more challenging four-day hike.

See also
 Seven Summits
 List of highest mountains of New Guinea
 Mount Leonard Murray
 Puncak Jaya

References

External links 

 

Wilhelm
Wilhelm
Madang Province
Chimbu Province
Western Highlands Province
Highest points of countries
Four-thousanders of New Guinea
Wilhelm